Brayons,  also called Madawaskayens, are a francophone people inhabiting the area in and around Madawaska County, New Brunswick, Canada, including some parts of northern Maine. In French, they are called  or feminine . They speak a French accent also called "Brayon".

Given their location in New Brunswick, and that most Brayons descend from Acadians who escaped the Deportation of the Acadians, they are considered by many to be Acadians. However, some residents relate more to Quebec and have strong roots and ancestral ties to Quebec. The Madawaska region was part of a border dispute and was claimed by Quebec when it was called Lower Canada. Brayons have a distinctive culture with a history and heritage linked to farming and forestry in the Madawaska area, unlike both the primarily maritime heritage of the modern Acadians and the St. Lawrence Valley history of the Québécois.

Etymology
"Brayon" used to be written as "Breillon". The origins of the word are not well known. It is hypothesized to have maybe been derived from the verb "Brayer" (to pull on a rope), the noun "Braie" ("old clothes" in certain dialects of the West of France), or the verb "Broyer" (to crush - the inhabitants of the region used to crush flax).

Geography 
The border between New Brunswick and Quebec and to some extent Maine traditionally did not matter much to the people of the area, which caused commonalities and close relationships between Brayons and Québécois and parts of northern Maine; likewise, Brayon French is not completely restricted to Madawaska County.

This view of uniqueness led (at least jokingly) to the founding of the République du Madawaska during the Aroostook War, wherein some Brayons, disgusted with the actions of both British and American interlopers on their historical lands, declared themselves allied with neither and independent. Of course, the république was never formally recognized and was ultimately split by the Webster-Ashburton Treaty into American and Canadian parts.

Other uses
Brayon(ne) is also the name of the inhabitants of the Pays de Bray in northwestern France (Normandy, Seine-Maritime département and Picardy, Oise département).

References

Acadia
Acadian culture in New Brunswick
Edmundston
French-Canadian culture in Maine
French-Canadian people
Quebec diaspora
Ethnic groups in Canada
French-speaking ethnicities in Canada